KSR-3 or KSR-III (Korean Sounding Rocket-3) is South Korean liquid sounding rocket designed by Korea Aerospace Research Institute. It was launched successfully on November 28, 2002, a rocket for scientific surveillance purposes.

Spec 
 Payload: 150 kg
 Apogee: 42.7 km
 Range: 79 km
 Thrust: 13 t
 Weight: 6.1 t
 Diameter: 0.42 m
 Length: 13.5 m
 Burn time: 53 sec
 Launch: November 28, 2002

See also 
 KSLV-I
 KSLV-II
 KARI KSR-1
 KARI KSR-2

References

Further reading 
 Encyclopedia Astronautica KSR-III. KSR-III

Sounding rockets of South Korea